The following is a list of notable websites that list free software projects. These directories and repositories of free software differ from software hosting facilities (or software forges) in the number of features they offer and the type of collaboration they are designed to promote.

General directories

Programming language specific directories

See also

Comparison of source-code-hosting facilities

Project directories